Imre Tóth (6 May 1948 – 13 April 2017) was a Hungarian boxer. He competed in the men's light heavyweight event at the 1972 Summer Olympics.

References

External links
 

1948 births
2017 deaths
Hungarian male boxers
Olympic boxers of Hungary
Boxers at the 1972 Summer Olympics
Martial artists from Budapest
Light-heavyweight boxers